Under the Sign of the Bull (French: Sous le signe du taureau) is a 1969 French drama film directed by Gilles Grangier and starring Jean Gabin, Suzanne Flon and Colette Deréal.

It was shot at the Saint-Maurice Studios in Paris. The film's sets were designed by the art director Robert Clavel.

Cast 
 Jean Gabin as Albert Raynal - un constructeur de fusées
 Suzanne Flon as Christine Raynal - sa femme
 Colette Deréal as Rolande - une restauratrice
 Raymond Gérôme as Jérôme Laprade - le beau-frère d'Albert
 Fernand Ledoux as Le juge
 Jacques Monod as L'industriel Marchal
 Alfred Adam as Vacher - le ferrailleur
 Michel Auclair as Le banquier Magnin
 Marthe Alycia as Mme Laprade Mère
 Louis Arbessier as Aupagneur
 Etienne Bierry as Lambert - un technicien
 Jean-Paul Moulinot as 	Pierre - le valet d'Augagneur
 Max Amyl as Le commissaire de Rouen
 Yves Arcanel as Le chef-mécanicien de Raynal
 André Badin as Un cuisinier
 René Bouloc as Jean-Pierre Raynal
 Robert Dalban as Le cafetier
 Jean-Pierre Hercé as Le cadet de Raynal
 Sophie Leclair as La dactylo
 Armand Meffre as Un ingénieur chez Raynal
 Albert Michel as Le bistrot des ferrailleurs
 Jean-Simon Prévost as Le financier
 Jean Thielment as Maître d'hôtel
 France Valéry as Gilberte Magnin - la femme d'un banquier
 Philippe Vallauris as Le secrétaire de Marchall
 Jean Valmence as Helmann - un commanditaire de Raynal
 Dominique Viriot as L'autostoppeur anglais

References

Bibliography 
 Harriss, Joseph. Jean Gabin: The Actor Who Was France. McFarland, 2018.

External links 
 

1969 films
1969 drama films
French drama films
1960s French-language films
Films directed by Gilles Grangier
Films shot at Saint-Maurice Studios
Films with screenplays by Michel Audiard
Gaumont Film Company films
1960s French films